Daniela Amavia (born 4 March 1966), also credited as Daniela Elle and Daniela Lunkewitz, is an actress and model, appearing in numerous films and international fashion events.

Career
Born in Greece, raised in Germany and schooled in the United Kingdom, Amavia speaks fluent Greek, German, French, and English.  As a young girl she was a dancer, but her teacher told her that she was too tall for the ballet, and suggested that she try acting. She began acting at the State Theatre Corps de Ballet, and studied drama and literature at Goethe University, and acting in London, where she soon received small roles. While studying to be an actress, she also modeled, doing runway work in Paris, France for Chanel and Dior, spokesmodel work for Chloé, and cover work for Vogue, Elle, and Femme.

In 2001, Amavia won the Best Actress award at the New York International Independent Film and Video Festival for the film The Woman Every Man Wants (aka Perfect Lover), as well as the Deutscher Filmpreis, the German equivalent of the Academy Award. In addition to acting and modeling, Amavia also has written, directed, and produced several short films.

In 2003, Amavia appeared as Alia Atreides in the TV miniseries Frank Herbert's Children of Dune. Laura Fries of Variety called her performance "layered".

In 2013, Amavia wrote and directed the indie drama A Beautiful Now, about a passionate dancer who finds herself considering an extreme act when she reaches a crossroads in her life.

References

External links

1966 births
Living people
Actresses from Athens
German female models
German film actresses
German people of Greek descent
German television actresses
Goethe University Frankfurt alumni
Greek emigrants to Germany